League Tables for teams participating in Kakkonen, the third tier of the Finnish Soccer League system, in 2000.

League Tables 2000

Southern Group, Etelälohko

Eastern Group, Itälohko

Western Group, Länsilohko

Northern Group, Pohjoislohko

Promotion Playoffs

WP-35 – AC Vantaa 1–1
AC Vantaa –  WP-35 2–0

AC Vantaa won 3–1 on aggregate.

JBK – KaaPo 1–1
KaaPo – JBK 0–5

JBK won 6–1 on aggregate.

AC Vantaa – Rakuunat, Lappeenranta 0–0
Rakuunat, Lappeenranta – AC Vantaa 2–0

Rakuunat won 2–0 on aggregate and retained their place in the Ykkönen.

JBK, Jakobstad – Närpes Kraft 0–3
Närpes Kraft – JBK Jakobstad 0–1

Närpes Kraft won 3–1 on aggregate and retained their place in the Ykkönen

Leading goal scorers

Etelälohko

31 - Tommi Uusitalo AC Vantaa
21 - Jukka Suikki IF Gnistan
13 - Juha Hämäläinen LePa
13 - Jon Poulsen KäPa

Itälohko

15 - Jani Uotinen FC Kuusankoski
14 - Arto Lautamatti FC Kuusankoski 
14 - Kimmo Pöyhönen Kings
11 - Tuomo Holmberg JJK

Länsilohko

24 - Kimmo Piirainen SalPa
17 - Lembit Rajala MIFK
15 - Pekka Riikonen Ponnistus

Pohjoislohko

19 - Niklas Blomqvist FC Korsholm
18 - Oleg Dulub TP-47
17 - Pekka Kainu KPV-j

Footnotes

References and sources
Finnish FA, Suomen Palloliitto 
Kakkonen 

Kakkonen seasons
3
Fin
Fin